The Old Debauchees, originally titled The Despairing Debauchee, was a play written by Henry Fielding. It originally appeared with The Covent-Garden Tragedy on 1 June 1732 at the Royal Theatre, Drury Lane and was later revived as The Debauchees; or, The Jesuit Caught. The play tells the story of Catholic priest's attempt to manipulate a man to seduce the man's daughter, ultimately unsuccessfully.

Unlike The Covent-Garden Tragedy, The Old Debauchees was well received. The play discussed morality and society's perceptions of morality and was an allusion to a real event like Fielding's other play, Rape upon Rape. Contemporary critics were unclear as to how successful the play was, but modern critics claimed that the play was only effective in the context of its social commentary.

Background
Both The Old Debauchees and The Covent-Garden Tragedy were written by 4 April 1732 when Fielding signed an agreement with John Watts to publish the plays for a small sum of only 30 guineas. The Old Debauchees, originally titled The Despairing Debauchee, appeared with The Covent-Garden Tragedy on 1 June 1732. The Daily Post reported on 2 June that both were well-received, but retracted that claim on 5 June to say that only The Old Debauchees was well received. The play ran for six nights with one scheduled night cancelled, the 13 June performance. After that night, the play was paired with The Mock Doctor.

The play was revived late 1745 as The Debauchees; or, The Jesuit Caught and ran 25 times during the season. This version was published by Watts with the various revisions indicated. It was brought back to promote anti-Catholic sentiment during the disputes between the British government and the Stuarts during 1745 and 1746. "The Jesuit Caught" was added to the play's title to reinforce the anti-Catholic nature of the play.

Cast
Cast of the play include:
 Old Laroon
 Jourdain
 Young Laroon
 Isabel – Jourdain's daughter, played by Kitty Clive
 Father Martin

Plot
Young Laroon plans to marry Isabel, but Father Martin manipulates Isabel's father, Jourdain, to seduce Isabel. However, other characters, including both of the Laroons, try to manipulate Jourdain for their own ends; they accomplish it through disguising themselves as priests and using his guilt to convince him of what they say. As Father Martin pursues Isabel, she is clever enough to realise what is happening and plans her own trap. After catching him and exposing his lust, Father Martin is set to be punished.

Themes
Like Rape upon Rape, the title The Old Debauchees is an allusion to a real individual and his corrupt actions. The basis of the play is connected to an October 1731 trial of Father Girard. Part of the plot incorporates Fielding's own anti-Catholic bias, but he does so in a way that is traditional to English theatre during his time. However, his placement of anti-Catholic rhetoric in Old Laroon's speeches undermines the comedic nature of the words and caused the sentiment to fall flat among audiences.

Also, Fielding relies on the play to talk about morality and how society views morality. He discusses doubt and faith along with politics when he takes on most aspects of society. It is possible that there are connections within the play's commentary to George II's mistresses or Robert Walpole's relationship with Maria Skerritt and his wife's relationship with Lord Hervey. Tiffany Potter sees the commentary as representing that "it is equally the voice of a libertine mocking those who thoughtlessly accept the constraints of social decorum, gender roles, and sexual repression. This understanding of the play, combined with Fielding's own unorthodox behavior and frequent questioning of social doctrines at this time in his life, marks him to some degree as an advocate of the libertine tradition."

Sources
The obvious source of the play is the Father Girard's trial for seducing Marie Catharine Cadier. This was a popular subject and other plays, including Father Girard the Sorcerer and The Wanton Jesuit, portrayed the events for which Girard was put on trial. He was a Jesuit tried for using magic on Catherine Cadiere. Fielding differs from other accounts by reducing Cadiere as a victim and instead makes her intelligent enough to see through Girard's plot.

Critical response
The Daily Post wrote on 5 June 1732: "We are assured the Comedy call'd The Old Debauchees, did meet with universal Applause; but the Covent Garden Tragedy will be Acted no more, both the Author and the Actors being unwilling to continue any Piece contrary to the Opinion of the Town." The Grub-Street Journal reprinted this on 8 June and proceeded to criticise The Covent-Garden Tragedy. On 16 June the Daily Post wrote again that the play was successful but the 29 June Grub-Street Journal countered that the play fell apart by the third night. However, the 13 July 1732 Grub-Street Journal stated that the play was a success and credited Theophilus Cibber's portrayal of Father Martin. However, the writer did complain that Fielding's critique was not limited to just Catholics.

According to Robert Hume, "The Old Debauchees is an unusual combination of farcical buffoonery and harsh invective, and not an effective one." Likewise, Potter points out that "The Old Debauchees has been critically dismissed since its initial appearance. Nonetheless, the drama is successful as a piece of social commentary that is both entertaining and enlightening." The Battesins character the play as a "tasteless attempt to capitalize on the sensational case of Father Girard" but that "Fielding was merely doing for his own theatre what others had already done". Harold Pagliaro points out that "For all its vitality, especially in its celebration of sexuality, in and out of marriage, and its farcical management of Father Martin, The Old Debauchees includes a dark element which its comic force controls only fleetingly."

Notes

References
 Battestin, Martin, and Battestin, Ruthe. Henry Fielding: a Life. London: Routledge, 1993.
 Cleary, Thomas. Henry Fielding, Political Writer. Waterloo, Ontario: Wilfrid Laurier University Press, 1984.
 Fielding, Henry. Plays Vol. 1 (1728–1731). Ed. Thomas Lockwood. Oxford: Clarendon Press, 2004.
 Hume, Robert. Fielding and the London Theater. Oxford: Clarendon Press, 1988.
 Pagliaro, Harold. Henry Fielding: A Literary Life. New York: St Martin's Press, 1998.
 Potter, Tiffany. Honest Sins: Georgian Libertinism & the Plays & Novels of Henry Fielding. London: McGill-Queen's University Press, 1999.

External links

Plays by Henry Fielding
Comedy plays
1732 plays